This page presents the results of the Men's and Women's Volleyball Tournament during the 1999 Pan American Games, which was held from July 24 to August 2, 1999, in Winnipeg, Manitoba, Canada. There were four medal events, two (indoor and beach) for both men and women.

Men's indoor tournament

Squads

Preliminary round

Group A

 July 24

 July 26

 July 27

Group B

 July 25

 July 26

 July 28

Classification round

Fifth to eighth place
 July 30

Seventh place
 July 31

Fifth place
 July 31

Semi-finals
 July 31

Bronze-medal match
 August 2

Gold-medal match
 August 2

Final standings

Women's indoor tournament

Squads

Round robin

 July 23

 July 24

 July 25

 July 27

 July 28

Fifth place
 July 30

Semi-finals
 July 30

Bronze-medal match
 August 1

Gold-medal match
 August 1

Final standings

Medal table

External links
 Brazilian site with full results
 Men's Pan American Games – July 29 – August 4, 1999, Winnipeg, Canada at the Beach Volleyball Database

P
1999
Events at the 1999 Pan American Games